Dhana 51 is a 2005 Indian Telugu-language romantic action film directed by R. Soorya Kiran and starring Sumanth and Saloni Aswani with Mukesh Khanna in a negative role. This film inspired the storyline of the Kannada film Bindaas (2008).

Cast 

Sumanth as Dhananjay a.k.a. Dhana
Saloni Aswani as Lakshmi 
Mukesh Khanna as Mahesh Chandra
Tanikella Bharani
Dharmavarapu Subramanyam as Dhana's father
Rajakumar
Mallikarjuna Rao
Kanta Rao
Ali
 Delhi Rajeswari
 Radha Kumar
Gautam Raju
Gundu Hanumantha Rao
R. Soorya Kiran (guest appearance)
Kalyani (guest appearance)

Production 
After the success of Satyam, R. Soorya Kiran, Sumanth and Chakri reunited for this film. The title was changed from 51 to Dhana 51 because Sumanth's previous films named after the hero's character (Satyam and Gowri) were box office successes. This film marks the Telugu debut of Mumbai-based Saloni Aswani and  Shaktimaan-fame Mukesh Khanna.

Soundtrack 
Music by Chakri.
"Aravirisina Mogga" – Chakri
"Avunanave Avunani" - P. Unnikrishnan
"China Goda" – Kousalya, Shankar Mahadevan
"Dhana 51" – Soorya Kiran, Vasu, Vishwa, Lahari
"I Am In Love" – Anitha
"Kovaa Kovaa" – Balaji, Gowri Srinivas, Matin, Pallavi, Ravi Varma, Soorya Kiran, Vasu, Kameshwari

Release and reception
The film released on 14 January 2005 coinciding with Sankranthi.

Jeevi of Idlebrain.com gave the film a rating of 2.5 out of 5 and opined that "Dhana 51 suffers with inadequate screenplay, uneven narration and confused characterization. Dhana 51 is most unexpected from a director who made his debut with Satyam film". Ravi Kalaga of Full Hyderabad wrote that "A remake in the essence, albeit with changes in the locations, songs, sidekicks and vocations of the actors, Dhana is essentially a cut-copy-paste version of their earlier enterprise [Satyam], with new fonts and colors (literally!)".

References 

Films scored by Chakri
2000s Telugu-language films